Anzhelika Varum, real name Maria Yurievna Varum (born 26 May 1969), is a Russian singer and actress, and an Honored Artist of the Russian Federation. She released 12 albums, starting with "Good bye, moi mal'chik" (Good-bye, my boy) in 1991. More than 60 of her songs became hits, receiving heavy radio play. She is married to the Russian singer Leonid Agutin. Merited Artist of the Russian Federation (2011).

Biography
Varum was born in Lviv to composer Yury Ignatievich Varum and theater producer Galina Mikhailovna Shapovalova. At the age of 5, she began to study the piano and, after starting school, she started to learn the guitar. She was part of the school's musical theater group and performed with them throughout Ukraine. After high school, Varum applied to the Boris Schukin Theater Institute in Moscow, but could not pass the entrance exams. She then began to work as a back-up singer at her father's music studio.

In 1990, Varum recorded a version of "Polunochniy kovboy" (Midnight cowboy) that soon became a hit, particularly after she performed it in the television show "Utrenneya zvezda" (Morning star) and at a concert at the Sports Complex "Olympic". On the back of that initial success, Varum released her first album, "Good bye, moi mal'chik" (Good-bye, my boy). The title song and the songs "Sosedniy parenek" (Neighborhood boy) and "Chelovek-svistok" (Human-whistle) became hits.

Two years later, Varum recorded the album "La-la-fa" that became hugely popular in Russia. It included the song "Khudozhnik kotoriy risuyet dozhd" (Painter who draws the rain) and the song "Gorodok" (Town), which became one of the singer's calling cards. In 1994, Varum made it to the finals of the Russian annual festival "Pesnya goda" (Song of the year).

In 1995, Varum released a compilation of hits and a new album called "Osenniy dzhaz" (Autumn jazz) that won the "Ovation" award as the best album of 1995, with Varum taking the "Ovation" for best singer of the year. The next year, Varum released "V dvukh minutakh ot liubvi" (Two minutes from love). Around the same time, the perfume "Anzhelika Varum" made its debut on the Russian market. Varum remained prolific, releasing "Zimniya vishnia" (Winter cherry) in 1996. The songs "Eto vse dlia tebia" (It's all for you), "Drugaya zhenchina" (The other woman), and the title song all crowded the hit parades of leading Russian radio stations.

In 1997, Varum played in the musical "Poza emigranta" (The emigrant's pose) and won the "Chaika" award for her performance. She also began a creative collaboration with Leonid Agutin that soon turned into a romantic relationship. In 1999, Varum and Agutin had a baby girl whom they named Elisaveta. The same year, Varum released her seventh album, "Tol'ko ona" (Only she) and a collection of hits titled "The Best". She also appeared in a feature film, playing a leading role in Vasiliy Pichul's "Nebo v almazakh" (Night in diamonds).

In 2000, Varum released "Sluzhebniy roman" (Workplace romance), a collaborative album that she created together with Leonid Agutin. The couple also toured throughout Russia with a concert program titled "Polovina serdtsa" (Half of a heart).

In 2001, Varum created the "Varum Records Company", which she used as a vehicle for producing her own music and representing other artists. She released a new album in 2002 titled "Stop, lyubopytstvo" (Stop, curiosity). She also created two new concert programs, a solo program titled after the new album, and a duet program with Agutin called "Rimskiye kanikuly" (Roman holiday).

In 2003, she played in the film "Kamenskaya 3: Kogda bogi smeyutsia" (When gods laugh), a detective thriller. Later that year, she released the single "Pozhar" (Fire). The following year, Varum toured extensively with Agutin, giving live concerts in the United States, Germany, Israel, Belarus, Ukraine, and throughout Russia.

In 2005, she created a new concert program with Agutin called "Ty i Ya" (You and I), with which they toured throughout Europe and the United States. She also helped Agutin to record his first English language record. Created together with Al Di Meola and titled "Cosomopolitan Life", the album dropped in Europe in the spring of 2005 and quickly topped the charts. The album included the Varum and Agutin duet "If I'll get a chance".

After spending much of 2006 touring, Varum released a new album in 2007 called "Muzika" (Music) that included both new and old songs. This was followed up by another album in 2009 titled "Yesli on uidet" (If he leaves). For the first time in her career, Varum not only sang, but also wrote the lyrics for some of the songs.

In 2010 and 2011, Varum and Agutin gave a series of concerts in most of Russia's major cities, including a performance at the Kremlin in collaboration with the renowned Cuban musician Orlando "Maraca" Valle.

Videos 
 1991 — Babylon
 1991 — Barabashka
 1992 — Whistle Man
 1993 — Artist that Draws Rain
 1995 — Autumn Jazz
 1996 — Not Тoday
 1996 — Neither Answer nor Greetings
 1996 — Winter Сherry
 1997 — Another Woman
 1997 — Queen (duet with Leonid Agutin)
 1999 — All in your hands (duet with Leonid Agutin)
 2000 — Do not wait for me
 2000 — I Wanna Be Loved by You 
 2001 — Will You Near You
 2001 — Stop Curiosity!
 2002 — If You Ever Someone Will Forgive Me (duet with Leonid Agutin)
 2002 — Fire
 2004 — The Вest (duet with Via slivki)
 2007 — You and me
 2007 — Two Roads, Two Ways (duet with Leonid Agutin)
 2008 — Where are you
 2009 — If He Will Go
 2009 — Let's forget
 2011 — How not to Think of You (duet with Leonid Agutin)
 2012 — Where are you
 2013 — Crazy
 2013 — I am always with you

Discography
 1991 – Good bye, moy mal'chik
 1993 – La–la–fa
 1995 – Collected works
 1995 – Osenniy dzhaz (Autumn jazz)
 1996 – V dvukh minutakh ot liubvi (Two minutes from love)
 1996 – Zimniya vishnia (Winter cherry)
 1998 – Tol'ko ona... (Only she)
 1999 – The Best
 2000 – Sluzhebniy roman (Workplace romance)
 2002 – Stop, liubopytstvo (Stop, curiosity)
 2007 – Muzika (Music)
 2009 – Esli on uidyot (If he leaves)
 2013 – Sumashedshaya (Crazy)
 2016 – Zhenshchina shla (The woman was walking)
 2018 – Na pauzu (Pause)
 2018 – Grustnaya bossa (Sad bossa)

Filmography
 1992 – Julia
 1995 – Old Songs on the Main (Old songs about what matters, a made–for–television musical)
 1996 – Old Songs on the Main 2 1997 – Old Songs on the Main 3 1998 – Old Songs on the Main 4 1999 – Night in Diamonds as Vika
 1999 – Dossier of Detective Dubrovsky as Lena Posadskaya
 2000 – Old Songs on the Main P.S. 2003 – Kamensakaya 3: When the Gods Laugh as Svetlana Medvedeva
 2005 – Twelve Сhairs as Ellochka liudoyedka (Ella man–eater)
 2006 – First Fast 
 2008 – New Year's Eve on Channel 1 2009 – New Year's Eve on Channel 1 2010 – Beauty Requires...''

References

External links

Anzhelika Varum at SoundCloud

1969 births
20th-century Russian women singers
20th-century Russian singers
21st-century Russian women singers
21st-century Russian singers
Living people
Musicians from Lviv
Honored Artists of the Russian Federation
Russian activists against the 2022 Russian invasion of Ukraine
Russian people of Ukrainian descent
Russian pop singers
Winners of the Golden Gramophone Award